Szczecińskie Przedsiębiorstwo Autobusowe "Dąbie" (SPAD or SPA Dąbie) is one of four municipal bus transport companies in Szczecin, Poland. The headquarters is located at the right bank of Szczecin, at 10 Andrzeja Struga Street. The company is owned by the city of Szczecin.

It has been operating as a separate company since 1 November 1999. That day, according to the resolution of Szczecin city council, the company was separated from MZK Szczecin. On behalf of the Zarząd Dróg i Transportu Miejskiego, the company currently operates following bus lines:  52, 54, 55, 56, 61, 62, 64, 65, 66, 71, 73, 77, 79, 81, 84 (daytime lines), A, B, C, D, E and G (fast lines), and night lines 533, 534.

The current chairman is Włodzimierz Sołtysiak.

Vehicles

See also
 Tramwaje Szczecińskie, trams

References

External links 
 Official website of the company
 Public transport Szczecin

Transport in Szczecin